Luckenwalde (Upper and ) is the capital of the Teltow-Fläming district in the German state of Brandenburg. The town area includes the villages of Frankenfelde and Kolzenburg.

Overview

The former Slavic settlement of Lugkin was conquered by Margrave Conrad Wettin of Meissen in the course of the 1147 Wendish Crusade. Lukenwalde Castle was first mentioned in a 1216 deed as a burgward of the Bishopric of Brandenburg, it was acquired by Zinna Abbey in 1285. Together with Zinna it remained under the rule of the Archbishopric of Magdeburg and its successor, the Prussian Duchy of Magdeburg until it was attached to the Margraviate of Brandenburg in 1773.

Originating in the 17th century, Luckenwalde's cloth and wool factories did not spring up till the reign of King Frederick II of Prussia and soon were among the most extensive in Germany. Other traditional industries were cotton printing and a dye works, brewing, and the making of metal and bronze goods. In 1808 Luckenwalde officially received town privileges.

By the turn of the 20th Century Luckenwalde became renowned as a key manufacturer of hats. In 1921 the two biggest hat ateliers, Herrmann and Steinberg, merged and set up their factory on an industrial estate in Luckenwalde. The factory was designed by German architect Erich Mendelsohn in 1923, the factory is considered a milestone of Expressionist architecture. The hat factory fell into disrepair during and after the war period and was restored in 2001, but as of 2013 the building remains empty.

During World War II, there was a Stalag for prisoners of war (Stalag III-A). There was also a work camp for civilians. The Nazis forced people to work for their war effort or else the families of people who worked there would perish. Lack of food and hard work killed thousands. Among them were Poles, Italians, French and many more. There were several places in the town and surrounding areas where they worked.  Luckenwalde was taken by the Red Army on 22 April 1945.

Demography

Politics
Seats in the municipal assembly (Stadtverordnetenversammlung) as of 2014 elections:
The Left: 10
Social Democratic Party of Germany (SPD): 9
Christian Democratic Union (CDU): 6
Bauernverband (BV): 1
Free Democratic Party (FDP): 1
National Democratic Party of Germany (NPD): 1

Transport
Luckenwalde station is located on the Berlin–Halle railway.

Notable people
 Marianne Adam (born 1951), shot putter
 Carl (Carlos) Anwandter (1801–1889), 1848 revolutionary, emigre to Chile
 Ilka Bessin (born 1971), comedian (Cindy aus Marzahn)
 Rudi Dutschke (1940–1979), spokesman of the German 1968 student movement, attended school in Luckenwalde
 Hans Freudenthal (1905–1990), mathematician
 Hans Grohe (1871–1955), industrialist
 Michael Hanack (1931–2019), chemist
 Carl Harries (1866–1923), chemist
 Hans-Joachim Hecht (born 1939 ), chess master
 David Hollwitz (born 1989), footballer
 Bernhard Kadenbach (born 1933), biochemist
 Paul Koebe (1882–1945), mathematician
 Niklas Kohrt (born 1980), actor
 Hans Krueger (1909–1988), Gestapo officer and Holocaust perpetrator, attended school in Luckenwalde
 Susanne Lahme (born 1951), volleyball player
 Werner Lamberz (1929–1978), senior politician in the GDR, apprenticed in Luckenwalde
 Carla Nelte (born 1990), badminton player
 Maria Nicklisch (1904–1995), stage actress
 Katherina Reiche (born 1973), politician (CDU)
 Heinz-Joachim Rothenburg (born 1944), shot putter
 Herbert Schoen (1929–2014), footballer
 Franz Urbig (1864–1944), banker

International relations

Luckenwalde is twinned with:
 Dieppe, Seine-Maritime, France
 Bad Salzuflen, Germany

References

External links

Notgeld (emergency banknotes) depicting the industries Luckenwalde was known for in the early 20th century. http://webgerman.com/Notgeld/Directory/L/Luckenwalde.htm

Localities in Teltow-Fläming